Castle Cove is a suburb on the lower North Shore of Sydney, in the state of New South Wales, Australia. Castle Cove is situated on the western side of Middle Harbour.

History 
The Cammeraygal people of the Guringai nation lived in the area until the 1820s and are recorded as being in the northern parts of the Sydney region for approximately 5,800 years.

It is believed that Castle Cove was named after the estate of Henry Hastings Willis, a prominent member of the Parliament of New South Wales at the time.

In 1858 the first grant purchase was made to Dr H. G. Alleyne. By 1878 almost all the land on the peninsula had been sold. In 1886 most of the area had been resold to Andrew Armstrong who formed the Cammeray Estate Land Company, which went into liquidation in 1893. In 1903-04 the Willis family built "Innisfallen Castle", a grand, castle-like house. They had purchased  from Dr Alleyne on a default mortgage and used the land for light farming.

In 1958 the Hooker Corporation acquired a controlling interest in Walter Burley Griffin's company, The Greater Sydney Development Association, which had owned most of Castlecrag, Middle Harbour and Castle Cove. From 1956 to 1970 Castle Cove was developed by Headland Developments and Hooker-Rex Estates.

Around 1985, the descendants of Henry Willis attempted to subdivide the land around the Castle, to be used for construction of several town houses, and turn the Castle into a wedding reception centre. As the land earmarked for the town houses was previously donated to the Castle owners by the government to enhance the Castle grounds, it was felt that profiting from this was inappropriate. As a result, Willoughby Council rejected the rezoning required to build the townhouses. Permission to run a business from the Castle was also rejected. The Castle owners then sold the property for approx $4 million, via an onsite public auction.

Heritage listings 
Castle Cove has a number of heritage-listed sites, including:
 14 Cherry Place: Innisfallen Castle and grounds

Population 
According to the 2016 census, there were 2,554 residents in Castle Cove.  60.8% of people were born in Australia. The next most common countries of birth were China 7.1% and England 4.5%. 67.4% of people spoke only English at home. Other languages spoken at home included Cantonese 8.3% and Mandarin 7.5%. The most common responses for religion were No Religion 30.6%, Catholic 25.6% and Anglican 16.8%.

Education 
Castle Cove Public School is a co-educational public school. It accommodates students from years Kindergarten to 6.

References 

The Book of Sydney Suburbs, Compiled by Frances Pollen, Angus & Robertson Publishers, 1990, Published in Australia

External links 

Castle Cove/Middle Cove, Willoughby City Council – community profile
 Castle Cove Public School
 New South Wales Department of Education and Training School Locator – Castle Cove Public School

Suburbs of Sydney
City of Willoughby